Panagiotis Manios (born 26 May 1996) is a Greek professional footballer who plays as a forward for Super League 2 club Anagennisi Karditsa.

References

1996 births
Living people
Greek footballers
Super League Greece 2 players
Football League (Greece) players
Gamma Ethniki players
Anagennisi Karditsa F.C. players
Association football forwards
People from Siatista
Footballers from Western Macedonia